Río Grande is a barrio in the municipality of Morovis, Puerto Rico. Río Grande has six sectors and its population in 2010 was 594.

History
Puerto Rico was ceded by Spain in the aftermath of the Spanish–American War under the terms of the Treaty of Paris of 1898 and became an unincorporated territory of the United States. In 1899, the United States Department of War conducted a census of Puerto Rico finding that the population of Río Grande barrio was 841.

Río Grande was flooded when Hurricane Maria struck on September 20, 2017. The Río Grande River destroyed many homes and came up as high as 2 feet under La Playita restaurant, which is a restaurant on stilts. The people in the community were left isolated and without power.

Sectors

Barrios (which are roughly comparable to minor civil divisions) in turn are further subdivided into smaller local populated place areas/units called sectores (sectors in English). The types of sectores may vary, from normally sector to urbanización to reparto to barriada to residencial, among others.

The following sectors are in Río Grande barrio:

, and  
.

Gallery
Scenes around Río Grande, Morovis:

See also

 List of communities in Puerto Rico

References

External links
 

Barrios of Morovis, Puerto Rico